Golden Choice (foaled 1983) is a Canadian Thoroughbred racehorse best known for winning Canada's most prestigious horse race, the Queen's Plate. Sired by Val de l'Orne, the 1975 Prix du Jockey Club winner, his damsire was Barachois, a son of Northern Dancer. Golden Choice was purchased as a yearling for $60,000 at the Canadian Thoroughbred Horse Society (CTHS) sale at Woodbine.

Racing as a three-year-old, he finished third in the 1986  Plate Trial Stakes and then won the first two legs of the Canadian Triple Crown. The Queen's Plate was the first ever win for Golden Choice, who then defeated the great filly Carotene to capture the Prince of Wales Stakes. However, in the final leg of the Triple Crown series, he finished third to Carotene. Among his other victories in 1986, Golden Choice won the Niagara Breeders' Cup Stakes. His performances that year earned him the Sovereign Award for Champion 3-Year-Old Male Horse.

His co-owner, Richard "Dick" Sanderson, wrote a book about Golden Choice titled The Choice was GOLDEN :The True Story of a Racehorse. Noted ABC sportscaster Jim McKay said of the book: "There are more good stories in horse racing than in any other sport. This is one of them."

References
 Sanderson, Dick The Choice was GOLDEN : The True Story of a Racehorse (1988) Caxton Hall Publishers 
 Golden Choice's pedigree and partial racing stats

1983 racehorse births
Racehorses bred in Ontario
Racehorses trained in Canada
King's Plate winners
Sovereign Award winners
Thoroughbred family 4-r